Ginette Garcin (4 January 1928 – 10 June 2010) was a French actress of stage, film and television.

Biography
She lived in Audresselles, Pas-de-Calais. Ginette Garcin made her musical debut with Jacques Hélian and his orchestra in 1946. She then worked with Loulou Gasté and went on to appear in Strélesky's absurdist theatre revues in Rouen. Her portrayal of Charlot to the music of Deux petits chaussons was very well received. She collaborated with Colette Vudal (who later adopted the name Colette Monroy in Paris) Mona Monick and Robert Thomas, author of some successful detective plays.

Garcin was one of the first to perform and record the songs of Boby Lapointe and Jean Yanne in the 1960s. In the 1970s, she embarked on a career in film and theatre, with guidance from Audiard, Lelouch, Yanne, Boisset and Tacchella. She appeared in the television series Marc et Sophie. In 1990, she wrote the critically acclaimed Le clan des veuves in which she starred alongside Jackie Sardou for four years. In 1997, she had an acting and singing role in Le passe-muraille, a musical comedy by Marcel Aymé with Didier van Cauwelaert and Michel Legrand.

In her final decade, Ginette Garcin played a character in the television series Famille d'accueil as well as appearing in the films La Beuze and Les Dalton. A new version of Le clan des veuves was staged at the Bouffes-Parisiens theatre in 2006.

Also in her later years she appeared in Raphaël Mezrahi's play, Monique est demandée en caisse 12.

Death
She died on 10 June 2010 at age 82 of breast cancer.

Filmography

Theatre

References

External links
  
  Fiche Bide et Musique

1928 births
2010 deaths
Deaths from cancer in France
French film actresses
French stage actresses
French television actresses
Actresses from Marseille
20th-century French actresses
21st-century French actresses
Deaths from breast cancer